Stavropolovka is a village in Jayyl District of the Chüy Region of Kyrgyzstan. It was established in 1912. Its population was 1,285 in 2021.

References

Populated places in Chüy Region